The 1979 Pittsburgh Pirates had a record of 98 wins and 64 losses and captured the National League East Division title by two games over the Montreal Expos. The Pirates beat the Cincinnati Reds to win their ninth National League pennant, and the Baltimore Orioles to win their fifth World Series title – and also their last playoff series victory to date. The disco hit "We Are Family" by Sister Sledge was used as the team's theme song that season.

Offseason 
 October 23, 1978: Will McEnaney was released by the Pirates.
 December 4, 1978: Ken Macha was drafted from the Pirates by the Montreal Expos in the 1978 rule 5 draft.
 December 5, 1978: Odell Jones, Rafael Vásquez, and Mario Mendoza were traded by the Pirates to the Seattle Mariners for Enrique Romo, Rick Jones and Tom McMillan.

Regular season

Key transactions 

 April 19, 1979: Traded Frank Taveras to the New York Mets for Tim Foli and Greg Field (minors).
 June 28, 1979: Traded Fred Breining, Al Holland and Ed Whitson to the San Francisco Giants for Bill Madlock, Lenny Randle, and Dave Roberts.

Season standings

Record vs. opponents

Game log 

!width="5%"|Streak
|- bgcolor="ffbbbb"
| 1 || April 6 || Expos || 2–3  || Sosa || Tekulve (0–1) || — || 36,141 || 0–1 || L1
|- bgcolor="ccffcc"
| 2 || April 7 || Expos || 7–6 || Jackson (1–0) || Sosa || — || 8,700 || 1–1 || W1
|- bgcolor="ffbbbb"
| 3 || April 8 || Expos || 4–5 || May || Romo (0–1) || Palmer || 8,680 || 1–2 || L1
|- bgcolor="ffbbbb"
| 4 || April 10 || @ Phillies || 3–7 || Ruthven || Romo (0–2) || — || 48,235 || 1–3 || L2
|- bgcolor="ffbbbb"
| 5 || April 11 || @ Phillies || 4–5 || Carlton || Blyleven (0–1) || — || 26,281 || 1–4 || L3
|- bgcolor="ccffcc"
| 6 || April 12 || Cardinals || 3–1 || Robinson (1–0) || Denny || — || 3,986 || 2–4 || W1
|- bgcolor="ccffcc"
| 7 || April 13 || Cardinals || 7–6 || Bibby (1–0) || Schultz || Jackson (1) || 4,395 || 3–4 || W2
|- bgcolor="ccffcc"
| 8 || April 14 || Cardinals || 7–4 || Whitson (1–0) || Forsch || Jackson (2) || 10,940 || 4–4 || W3
|- bgcolor="ffbbbb"
| 9 || April 15 || Cardinals || 4–9  || Littell || Tekulve (0–2) || — || 3,012 || 4–5 || L1
|- bgcolor="ffbbbb"
| 10 || April 17 || Phillies || 2–13 || Carlton || Blyleven (0–2) || — || 7,739 || 4–6 || L2
|- bgcolor="ffbbbb"
| 11 || April 18 || Phillies || 2–3 || Lerch || Robinson (1–1) || — || 12,195 || 4–7 || L3
|- bgcolor="ffbbbb"
| 12 || April 20 || @ Astros || 4–5  || Sambito || Bibby (1–1) || — || 19,834 || 4–8 || L4
|- bgcolor="ffbbbb"
| 13 || April 21 || @ Astros || 4–5  || Andujar || Tekulve (0–3) || — || 48,977 || 4–9 || L5
|- bgcolor="ffbbbb"
| 14 || April 22 || @ Astros || 2–3 || Andujar || Candelaria (0–1) || Sambito || 22,403 || 4–10 || W1
|- bgcolor="ccffcc"
| 15 || April 24 || @ Reds || 9–2 || Robinson (2–1) || Pastore || — || 18,372 || 5–10 || W2
|- bgcolor="ccffcc"
| 16 || April 25 || @ Reds || 3–2  || Tekulve (1–3) || Tomlin || — || 20,155 || 6–10 || W3
|- bgcolor="ffbbbb"
| 17 || April 27 || Astros || 8–9  || Riccelli || Whitson (1–1) || — || 5,767 || 6–11 || L1
|- bgcolor="ccffcc"
| 18 || April 29 || Astros || 10–5 || Kison (1–0) || Niekro || Jackson (3) || 7,598 || 7–11 || W1

!width="5%"|Streak
|- bgcolor="ffbbbb"
| 19 || May 1 || Braves || 2–5 || Niekro || Tekulve (1–4) || — || 5,122 || 7–12 || L1
|- bgcolor="ccffcc"
| 20 || May 2 || Braves || 10–2 || Candelaria (1–1) || Mahler || — || 4,840 || 8–12 || W1
|- bgcolor="ffbbbb"
| 21 || May 4 || @ Cardinals || 3–4 || Sykes || Robinson (2–2) || Schultz || 13,525 || 8–13 || L1
|- bgcolor="ccffcc"
| 22 || May 5 || @ Cardinals || 6–5 || Jackson (2–0) || Vuckovich || Whitson (1) || 17,440 || 9–13 || W1
|- bgcolor="ffbbbb"
| 23 || May 6 || @ Cardinals || 2–4 || Martinez || Kison (1–1) || Knowles || 20,966 || 9–14 || L1
|- bgcolor="ccffcc"
| 24 || May 7 || @ Braves || 4–2 || Candelaria (2–1) || Mahler || Tekulve (1) || 8,166 || 10–14 || W1
|- bgcolor="ffbbbb"
| 25 || May 8 || @ Braves || 1–4 || Solomon || Rhoden (0–1) || — || 5,741 || 10–15 || L1
|- bgcolor="ccffcc"
| 26 || May 9 || @ Braves || 17–9 || Bibby (2–1) || Garber || Tekulve (2) || 6,855 || 11–15 || W1
|- bgcolor="ffbbbb"
| 27 || May 11 || Reds || 4–8 || Tomlin || Whitson (1–2) || Bair || 14,115 || 11–16 || L1
|- bgcolor="ccffcc"
| 28 || May 12 || Reds || 3–2 || Bibby (3–1) || Pastore || Jackson (4) || 18,745 || 12–16 || W1
|- bgcolor="ffbbbb"
| 29 || May 13 || Reds || 3–7 || LaCoss || Candelaria (2–2) || — || 10,253 || 12–17 || L1
|- bgcolor="ffbbbb"
| 30 || May 15 || Mets || 0–3 || Swan || Robinson (2–3) || Lockwood || 6,097 || 12–18 || L2
|- bgcolor="ccffcc"
| 31 || May 16 || Mets || 4–3  || Romo (1–2) || Lockwood || — || 7,621 || 13–18 || W1
|- bgcolor="ccffcc"
| 32 || May 17 || Mets || 6–5 || Tekulve (2–4) || Orosco || — || 6,295 || 14–18 || W2
|- bgcolor="ccffcc"
| 33 || May 18 || @ Cubs || 9–5 || Candelaria (3–2) || Holtzman || — || 12,578 || 15–18 || W3
|- bgcolor="ccffcc"
| 34 || May 19 || @ Cubs || 3–0 || Rooker (1–0) || Krukow || Jackson (5) || 29,460 || 16–18 || W4
|- bgcolor="ccffcc"
| 35 || May 20 || @ Cubs || 6–5 || Robinson (3–3) || McGlothen || Tekulve (3) || 30,998 || 17–18 || W5
|- bgcolor="ccffcc"
| 36 || May 21 || @ Expos || 4–2 || Blyleven (1–2) || Sanderson || Tekulve (4) || 25,154 || 18–18 || W6
|- bgcolor="ffbbbb"
| 37 || May 22 || @ Expos || 3–6 || Grimsley || Whitson (1–3) || Fryman || 15,227 || 18–19 || L1
|- bgcolor="ffbbbb"
| 38 || May 23 || @ Expos || 0–3 || Rogers || Candelaria (3–3) || — || 7,041 || 18–20 || L2
|- bgcolor="ffffff"
| 39 || May 25 || @ Mets || 3–3  || || || — || 6,611 || 18–20 ||
|- bgcolor="ffbbbb"
| 40 || May 26 || @ Mets || 8–10 || Lockwood || Tekulve (2–5) || — || 20,272 || 18–21 || L3
|- bgcolor="ccffcc"
| 41 || May 27 || @ Mets || 2–1 || Jackson (3–0) || Murray || — || 25,545 || 19–21 || W1
|- bgcolor="ccffcc"
| 42 || May 28 || @ Mets || 6–1 || Candelaria (4–3) || Falcone || Jackson (6) || 10,619 || 20–21 || W2
|- bgcolor="ccffcc"
| 43 || May 29 || Cubs || 8–0 || Robinson (4–3) || Holtzman || — || 7,196 || 21–21 || W3
|- bgcolor="ccffcc"
| 44 || May 30 || Cubs || 9–2 || Rooker (2–0) || McGlothen || — || 7,107 || 22–21 || W4
|- bgcolor="ccffcc"
| 45 || May 31 || Cubs || 4–3  || Kison (2–1) || Sutter || — || 6,438 || 23–21 || W5

!width="5%"|Streak
|- bgcolor="ccffcc"
| 46 || June 1 || Padres || 9–8 || Tekulve (3–5) || Shirley || — || 12,928 || 24–21 || W6
|- bgcolor="ffbbbb"
| 47 || June 2 || Padres || 1–3 || Perry || Candelaria (4–4) || — || 20,977 || 24–22 || L1
|- bgcolor="ccffcc"
| 48 || June 3 || Padres || 7–0 || Kison (3–1) || Owchinko || — || 13,370 || 25–22 || W1
|- bgcolor="ffbbbb"
| 49 || June 4 || Dodgers || 2–4 || Sutcliffe || Rooker (2–1) || — || 14,727 || 25–23 || L1
|- bgcolor="ccffcc"
| 50 || June 5 || Dodgers || 3–1 || Blyleven (2–2) || Sutton || Tekulve (5) || 11,088 || 26–23 || W1
|- bgcolor="ccffcc"
| 51 || June 6 || Dodgers || 5–4 || Romo (2–2) || Welch || Tekulve (6) || 16,666 || 27–23 || W2
|- bgcolor="ccffcc"
| 52 || June 8 || Giants || 3–2 || Romo (3–2) || Curtis || Jackson (7) || 18,227 || 28–23 || W3
|- bgcolor="ffbbbb"
| 53 || June 9 || Giants || 2–6 || Blue || Kison (3–2) || — || 25,814 || 28–24 || L1
|- bgcolor="ffbbbb"
| 54 || June 10 || Giants || 4–7 || Lavelle || Romo (3–3) || — || 25,536 || 28–25 || L2
|- bgcolor="ffbbbb"
| 55 || June 12 || @ Padres || 3–6 || Perry || Candelaria (4–5) || — || 23,759 || 28–26 || L3
|- bgcolor="ffbbbb"
| 56 || June 13 || @ Padres || 2–3 || Owchinko || Kison (3–3) || Fingers || 17,845 || 28–27 || L4
|- bgcolor="ffbbbb"
| 57 || June 14 || @ Padres || 1–2  || D'Acquisto || Candelaria (4–6) || — || 15,444 || 28–28 || L5
|- bgcolor="ccffcc"
| 58 || June 15 || @ Dodgers || 6–2 || Blyleven (3–2) || Sutton || Tekulve (7) || 50,299 || 29–28 || W1
|- bgcolor="ccffcc"
| 59 || June 16 || @ Dodgers || 6–3 || Robinson (5–3) || Welch || — || 49,448 || 30–28 || W2
|- bgcolor="ccffcc"
| 60 || June 17 || @ Dodgers || 5–1 || Whitson (2–3) || Reuss || Tekulve (8) || 45,835 || 31–28 || W3
|- bgcolor="ccffcc"
| 61 || June 19 || @ Giants || 9–4 || Candelaria (5–6) || Montefusco || Romo (1) || 39,861 || 32–28 || W4
|- bgcolor="ccffcc"
| 62 || June 20 || @ Giants || 8–5 || Jackson (4–0) || Lavelle || Tekulve (9) || 19,637 || 33–28 || W5
|- bgcolor="ccffcc"
| 63 || June 22 || Cubs || 7–2 || Blyleven (4–2) || Holtzman || — || 21,006 || 34–28 || W6
|- bgcolor="ffbbbb"
| 64 || June 23 || Cubs || 3–4 || Krukow || Robinson (5–4) || Sutter || 18,513 || 34–29 || L1
|- bgcolor="ffbbbb"
| 65 || June 24 || Cubs || 0–5 || Reuschel || Kison (3–4) || — || 43,402 || 34–30 || L2
|- bgcolor="ccffcc"
| 66 || June 25 || @ Mets || 8–1 || Candelaria (6–6) || Swan || — || || 35–30 || W1
|- bgcolor="ffbbbb"
| 67 || June 25 || @ Mets || 0–4 || Falcone || Rooker (2–2) || — || 14,666 || 35–31 || L1
|- bgcolor="ccffcc"
| 68 || June 26 || @ Mets || 2–1 || Blyleven (5–2) || Hausman || Jackson (8) || 11,903 || 36–31 || W1
|- bgcolor="ffbbbb"
| 69 || June 27 || Mets || 9–12 || Twitchell || Jackson (4–1) || — || 13,168 || 36–32 || L1
|- bgcolor="ffbbbb"
| 70 || June 28 || Mets || 2–3 || Allen || Bibby (3–2) || Glynn || 10,137 || 36–33 || L2
|- bgcolor="ccffcc"
| 71 || June 29 || Expos || 6–5 || Kison (4–4) || Lee || Tekulve (10) || 35,677 || 37–33 || W1
|- bgcolor="ffbbbb"
| 72 || June 30 || Expos || 3–5 || Sanderson || Blyleven (5–3) || Fryman || 13,865 || 37–34 || L1

!width="5%"|Streak
|- bgcolor="ccffcc"
| 73 || July 2 || @ Cardinals || 5–4 || Romo (4–3) || Knowles || Jackson (9) || 18,042 || 38–34 || W1
|- bgcolor="ccffcc"
| 74 || July 3 || @ Cardinals || 4–1 || Candelaria (7–6) || Forsch || Romo (2) || 17,130 || 39–34 || W2
|- bgcolor="ccffcc"
| 75 || July 4 || @ Cardinals || 6–4 || Blyleven (6–3) || Vuckovich || Jackson (10) || 14,766 || 40–34 || W3
|- bgcolor="ffbbbb"
| 76 || July 5 || @ Cardinals || 0–2 || Fulgham || Rooker (2–3) || — || 16,626 || 40–35 || L1
|- bgcolor="ffbbbb"
| 77 || July 6 || @ Reds || 1–2 || Bair || Jackson (4–2) || — || 32,264 || 40–36 || L2
|- bgcolor="ffbbbb"
| 78 || July 7 || @ Reds || 2–6 || Moskau || Robinson (5–5) || — || 36,300 || 40–37 || L3
|- bgcolor="ffbbbb"
| 79 || July 8 || @ Reds || 2–4 || Norman || Candelaria (7–7) || — || || 40–38 || L4
|- bgcolor="ccffcc"
| 80 || July 8 || @ Reds || 2–1 || Jackson (5–2) || Tomlin || Tekulve (11) || 43,099 || 41–38 || W1
|- bgcolor="ccffcc"
| 81 || July 10 || @ Astros || 4–3 || Bibby (4–2) || Andujar || Tekulve (12) || 31,341 || 42–38 || W2
|- bgcolor="ccffcc"
| 82 || July 11 || @ Astros || 5–1 || Kison (5–4) || Richard || — || 25,330 || 43–38 || W3
|- bgcolor="ccffcc"
| 83 || July 12 || @ Astros || 5–3 || Blyleven (7–3) || Niekro || Tekulve (13) || 22,956 || 44–38 || W4
|- bgcolor="ffbbbb"
| 84 || July 13 || @ Braves || 4–13 || Niekro || Rooker (2–4) || — || 17,018 || 44–39 || L1
|- bgcolor="ccffcc"
| 85 || July 14 || @ Braves || 5–1 || Candelaria (8–7) || Matula || — || 25,083 || 45–39 || W1
|- bgcolor="ccffcc"
| 86 || July 15 || @ Braves || 7–3 || Bibby (5–2) || Solomon || — || 11,304 || 46–39 || W2
|- style="text-align:center; background:#bbcaff;"
| colspan=10 | 50th All-Star Game in Seattle, Washington
|- bgcolor="ccffcc"
| 87 || July 19 || Astros || 9–5 || Roberts (1–0) || Forsch || — || || 47–39 || W3
|- bgcolor="ccffcc"
| 88 || July 19 || Astros || 4–2 || Kison (6–4) || Niekro || Jackson (11) || 33,464 || 48–39 || W4
|- bgcolor="ccffcc"
| 89 || July 20 || Astros || 9–3 || Candelaria (9–7) || Richard || — || 23,585 || 49–39 || W5
|- bgcolor="ccffcc"
| 90 || July 21 || Astros || 6–5 || Romo (5–3) || Sambito || Tekulve (14) || 19,570 || 50–39 || W6
|- bgcolor="ccffcc"
| 91 || July 22 || Braves || 5–4 || Robinson (6–5) || Solomon || Tekulve (15) || || 51–39 || W7
|- bgcolor="ccffcc"
| 92 || July 22 || Braves || 3–2 || Bibby (6–2) || Mahler || Tekulve (16) || 29,533 || 52–39 || W8
|- bgcolor="ccffcc"
| 93 || July 23 || Braves || 7–1 || Blyleven (8–3) || Hanna || — || || 53–39 || W9
|- bgcolor="ffbbbb"
| 94 || July 23 || Braves || 0–8 || Niekro || Rooker (2–5) || — || 27,148 || 53–40 || L1
|- bgcolor="ffbbbb"
| 95 || July 24 || Reds || 5–6 || Norman || Kison (6–5) || Bair || 19,517 || 53–41 || L2
|- bgcolor="ffbbbb"
| 96 || July 25 || Reds || 5–6  || Bair || Tekulve (3–6) || — || 17,296 || 53–42 || L3
|- bgcolor="ffbbbb"
| 97 || July 26 || Reds || 7–9 || Soto || Roberts (1–1) || Hume || 20,339 || 53–43 || L4
|- bgcolor="ccffcc"
| 98 || July 27 || @ Expos || 5–4 || Tekulve (4–6) || Sosa || Romo (3) || || 54–43 || W1
|- bgcolor="ccffcc"
| 99 || July 27 || @ Expos || 9–1 || Blyleven (9–3) || Sanderson || — || 59,260 || 55–43 || W2
|- bgcolor="ccffcc"
| 100 || July 28 || @ Expos || 5–3 || Bibby (7–2) || Schatzeder || Tekulve (17) || 38,661 || 56–43 || W3
|- bgcolor="ffbbbb"
| 101 || July 29 || @ Expos || 3–5 || Rogers || Kison (6–6) || — || 35,245 || 56–44 || L1
|- bgcolor="ccffcc"
| 102 || July 30 || Mets || 8–5 || Jackson (6–2) || Bernard || Tekulve (18) || 11,837 || 57–44 || W1
|- bgcolor="ffbbbb"
| 103 || July 31 || Mets || 1–2 || Twitchell || Blyleven (9–4) || Glynn || 10,739 || 57–45 || L1

!width="5%"|Streak
|- bgcolor="ccffcc"
| 104 || August 1 || Cardinals || 4–3 || Romo (6–3) || Forsch || Tekulve (19) || 16,124 || 58–45 || W1
|- bgcolor="ffbbbb"
| 105 || August 2 || Cardinals || 4–5 || Frazier || Jackson (6–3) || Knowles || 25,163 || 58–46 || L1
|- bgcolor="ccffcc"
| 106 || August 3 || Phillies || 6–3 || Romo (7–3) || McGraw || — || || 59–46 || W1
|- bgcolor="ccffcc"
| 107 || August 3 || Phillies || 5–1 || Bibby (8–2) || Christenson || — || 45,309 || 60–46 || W2
|- bgcolor="ccffcc"
| 108 || August 4 || Phillies || 4–0 || Candelaria (10–7) || Espinosa || — || 34,754 || 61–46 || W3
|- bgcolor="ccffcc"
| 109 || August 5 || Phillies || 12–8 || Tekulve (5–6) || Eastwick || — || || 62–46 || W4
|- bgcolor="ccffcc"
| 110 || August 5 || Phillies || 5–2 || Romo (8–3) || Noles || Tekulve (20) || 46,006 || 63–46 || W5
|- bgcolor="ffbbbb"
| 111 || August 7 || @ Cubs || 2–15 || Reuschel || Rooker (2–6) || — || 34,641 || 63–47 || L1
|- bgcolor="ccffcc"
| 112 || August 8 || @ Cubs || 5–2  || Tekulve (6–6) || Tidrow || — || 34,255 || 64–47 || W1
|- bgcolor="ffbbbb"
| 113 || August 9 || @ Cubs || 3–11 || Lamp || Candelaria (10–8) || — || 29,645 || 64–48 || L1
|- bgcolor="ffbbbb"
| 114 || August 10 || @ Phillies || 3–4  || Eastwick || Jackson (6–4) || — || || 64–49 || L2
|- bgcolor="ccffcc"
| 115 || August 10 || @ Phillies || 3–2 || Kison (7–6) || Lerch || Tekulve (21) || 63,346 || 65–49 || W1
|- bgcolor="ccffcc"
| 116 || August 11 || @ Phillies || 14–11 || Romo (9–3) || Eastwick || Tekulve (22) || 51,118 || 66–49 || W2
|- bgcolor="ccffcc"
| 117 || August 13 || @ Phillies || 9–1 || Bibby (9–2) || Christenson || — || 43,111 || 67–49 || W3
|- bgcolor="ccffcc"
| 118 || August 14 || Padres || 7–1 || Candelaria (11–8) || D'Acquisto || — || 23,210 || 68–49 || W4
|- bgcolor="ccffcc"
| 119 || August 15 || Padres || 5–1 || Blyleven (10–4) || Jones || — || 14,219 || 69–49 || W5
|- bgcolor="ccffcc"
| 120 || August 16 || Padres || 5–4 || Kison (8–6) || Perry || Romo (4) || 14,201 || 70–49 || W6
|- bgcolor="ffbbbb"
| 121 || August 17 || Dodgers || 6–7 || Patterson || Bibby (9–3) || Castillo || 22,416 || 70–50 || L1
|- bgcolor="ffbbbb"
| 122 || August 18 || Dodgers || 1–5 || Reuss || Robinson (6–6) || — || 40,238 || 70–51 || L2
|- bgcolor="ccffcc"
| 123 || August 19 || Dodgers || 2–0 || Tekulve (7–6) || Hooton || — || 28,382 || 71–51 || W1
|- bgcolor="ccffcc"
| 124 || August 20 || Giants || 6–5 || Romo (10–3) || Lavelle || Tekulve (23) || 18,714 || 72–51 || W2
|- bgcolor="ffbbbb"
| 125 || August 21 || Giants || 1–6 || Knepper || Kison (8–7) || — || 20,999 || 72–52 || L1
|- bgcolor="ccffcc"
| 126 || August 22 || Giants || 8–6 || Tekulve (8–6) || Lavelle || — || 19,768 || 73–52 || W1
|- bgcolor="ffbbbb"
| 127 || August 24 || @ Padres || 2–3 || Jones || Romo (10–4) || Lee || 16,890 || 73–53 || L1
|- bgcolor="ccffcc"
| 128 || August 25 || @ Padres || 4–3  || Roberts (2–1) || D'Acquisto || — || 14,607 || 74–53 || W1
|- bgcolor="ccffcc"
| 129 || August 26 || @ Padres || 9–2 || Kison (9–7) || Shirley || — || 13,006 || 75–53 || W2
|- bgcolor="ffbbbb"
| 130 || August 27 || @ Dodgers || 2–4 || Brett || Tekulve (8–7) || — || 35,705 || 75–54 || L1
|- bgcolor="ccffcc"
| 131 || August 28 || @ Dodgers || 4–1 || Candelaria (12–8) || Hough || — || 31,587 || 76–54 || W1
|- bgcolor="ccffcc"
| 132 || August 29 || @ Dodgers || 4–1 || Blyleven (11–4) || Reuss || Tekulve (24) || 32,816 || 77–54 || W2
|- bgcolor="ccffcc"
| 133 || August 31 || @ Giants || 6–4 || Robinson (7–6) || Curtis || Jackson (12) || 19,377 || 78–54 || W3

!width="5%"|Streak
|- bgcolor="ccffcc"
| 134 || September 1 || @ Giants || 5–3 || Kison (10–7) || Montefusco || Jackson (13) || 25,551 || 79–54 || W4
|- bgcolor="ccffcc"
| 135 || September 1 || @ Giants || 7–2 || Bibby (10–3) || Knepper || — || 27,382 || 80–54 || W5
|- bgcolor="ccffcc"
| 136 || September 2 || @ Giants || 5–3 || Candelaria (13–8) || Blue || — || 15,663 || 81–54 || W6
|- bgcolor="ffbbbb"
| 137 || September 3 || Phillies || 0–2 || Carlton || Blyleven (11–5) || McGraw || || 81–55 || L1
|- bgcolor="ccffcc"
| 138 || September 3 || Phillies || 7–3 || Rooker (3–6) || Lerch || Tekulve (25) || 43,444 || 82–55 || W1
|- bgcolor="ccffcc"
| 139 || September 5 || @ Cardinals || 7–5  || Roberts (3–1) || Thomas || Tekulve (26) || 23,059 || 83–55 || W2
|- bgcolor="ffbbbb"
| 140 || September 6 || @ Cardinals || 6–8 || Martinez || Bibby (10–4) || McEnaney || 14,767 || 83–56 || L1
|- bgcolor="ccffcc"
| 141 || September 7 || @ Mets || 6–4  || Jackson (7–4) || Allen || — || 8,290 || 84–56 || W1
|- bgcolor="ffbbbb"
| 142 || September 8 || @ Mets || 2–3  || Ellis || Rooker (3–7) || — || 8,095 || 84–57 || L1
|- bgcolor="ccffcc"
| 143 || September 9 || @ Mets || 6–5 || Tekulve (9–7) || Glynn || — || 9,093 || 85–57 || W1
|- bgcolor="ccffcc"
| 144 || September 11 || Cardinals || 7–3 || Roberts (4–1) || Denny || — || 15,757 || 86–57 || W2
|- bgcolor="ccffcc"
| 145 || September 12 || Cardinals || 2–0 || Candelaria (14–8) || Forsch || Tekulve (27) || 17,669 || 87–57 || W3
|- bgcolor="ccffcc"
| 146 || September 15 || Mets || 5–4 || Roberts (5–1) || Glynn || Tekulve (28) || 18,060 || 88–57 || W4
|- bgcolor="ffbbbb"
| 147 || September 16 || Mets || 0–3 || Falcone || Candelaria (14–9) || Allen || 25,364 || 88–58 || L1
|- bgcolor="ccffcc"
| 148 || September 17 || @ Expos || 2–1 || Robinson (8–6) || Rogers || — || 54,609 || 89–58 || W1
|- bgcolor="ccffcc"
| 149 || September 18 || @ Expos || 5–3  || Jackson (8–4) || Murray || Roberts (1) || 56,976 || 90–58 || W2
|- bgcolor="ccffcc"
| 150 || September 19 || @ Phillies || 9–6 || Tekulve (10–7) || Eastwick || Jackson (14) || || 91–58 || W3
|- bgcolor="ffbbbb"
| 151 || September 19 || @ Phillies || 5–6 || Kucek || Romo (10–5) || Saucier || 30,566 || 91–59 || L1
|- bgcolor="ffbbbb"
| 152 || September 20 || @ Phillies || 1–2 || Lerch || Tekulve (10–8) || — || 16,299 || 91–60 || L2
|- bgcolor="ffbbbb"
| 153 || September 21 || @ Cubs || 0–2 || McGlothen || Robinson (8–7) || — || 9,552 || 91–61 || L3
|- bgcolor="ccffcc"
| 154 || September 22 || @ Cubs || 4–1 || Kison (11–7) || Riley || Tekulve (29) || 24,657 || 92–61 || W1
|- bgcolor="ccffcc"
| 155 || September 23 || @ Cubs || 6–0 || Bibby (11–4) || Reuschel || — || 24,571 || 93–61 || W2
|- bgcolor="ccffcc"
| 156 || September 24 || Expos || 5–2 || Blyleven (12–5) || Schatzeder || Tekulve (30) || || 94–61 || W3
|- bgcolor="ffbbbb"
| 157 || September 24 || Expos || 6–7 || Grimsley || Jackson (8–5) || Sosa || 47,268 || 94–62 || L1
|- bgcolor="ccffcc"
| 158 || September 25 || Expos || 10–4 || Rooker (4–7) || Sanderson || Romo (5) || 31,348 || 95–62 || W1
|- bgcolor="ccffcc"
| 159 || September 26 || Expos || 10–1 || Kison (12–7) || Rogers || — || 42,043 || 96–62 || W2
|- bgcolor="ffbbbb"
| 160 || September 27 || Cardinals || 5–9 || Forsch || Roberts (5–2) || Littell || 11,172 || 96–63 || L1
|- bgcolor="ccffcc"
| 161 || September 28 || Cubs || 6–1 || Bibby (12–4) || Reuschel || — || 14,778 || 97–63 || W1
|- bgcolor="ffbbbb"
| 162 || September 29 || Cubs || 6–7  || Caudill || Robinson (8–8) || — || 25,734 || 97–64 || L1
|- bgcolor="ccffcc"
| 163 || September 30 || Cubs || 5–3 || Kison (13–7) || McGlothen || Tekulve (31) || 42,176 || 98–64 || W1

! colspan=9 | Legend:       = Win       = Loss       = TieBold = Pirates team member
Source: baseball-reference.com

Roster

Opening Day Lineup

Player stats 
Batting
Note: G = Games played; AB = At bats; H = Hits; Avg. = Batting average; HR = Home runs; RBI = Runs batted in

Pitching
Note: G = Games pitched; IP = Innings pitched; W = Wins; L = Losses; ERA = Earned run average; SO = Strikeouts

Postseason

Postseason game log 

|-  style="background:#cfc;"
| 1 || Oct 2 || @ Reds || 5–2 (11) || Jackson (1–0) || Hume (0–1) || Robinson (1) || 55,006 || PIT 1–0
|-  style="background:#cfc;"
| 2 || Oct 3 || @ Reds || 3–2 (10) || Robinson (1–0) || Bair (0–1) || — || 55,000 || PIT 2–0
|-  style="background:#cfc;"
| 3 || Oct 5 || Reds || 7–1 || Blyleven (1–0) || LaCoss (0–1) || — || 42,240 || PIT 3–0
|-

|-  style="background:#bbb;"
| || Oct 9 || @ Orioles || colspan="6"|Postponed (rain)
|-  style="background:#fbb;"
| 1 || Oct 10 || @ Orioles || 4–5 || Flanagan (2–0) || Kison (0–1) || — || 53,735 || BAL 1–0
|-  style="background:#cfc;"
| 2 || Oct 11 || @ Orioles || 3–2 || Robinson (2–0) || Stanhouse (1–2) || Tekulve (1) || 53,739 || Tied 1–1
|-  style="background:#fbb;"
| 3 || Oct 12 || Orioles || 4–8 || McGregor (2–0) || Candelaria (0–1) || — || 50,848 || BAL 2–1
|-  style="background:#fbb;"
| 4 || Oct 13 || Orioles || 6–9 || Stoddard (1–0) || Tekulve (0–1) || — || 50,883 || BAL 3–1
|-  style="background:#cfc;"
| 5 || Oct 14 || Orioles || 7–1 || Blyleven (2–0) || Flanagan (2–1) || — || 50,920 || BAL 3–2
|-  style="background:#cfc;"
| 6 || Oct 16 || @ Orioles || 4–0 || Candelaria (1–1) || Palmer (0–1) || Tekulve (2) || 53,739 || Tied 3–3
|-  style="background:#cfc;"
| 7 || Oct 17 || @ Orioles || 4–1 || Jackson (2–0) || McGregor (2–1) || Tekulve (3) || 53,733 || PIT 4–3
|-

|- style="text-align:center;"
| Legend:       = Win       = Loss       = PostponementBold = Pirates team member

National League Championship Series

Game 1 
October 2, Riverfront Stadium

Game 2 
October 3, Riverfront Stadium

Game 3 
October 5, Three Rivers Stadium

World Series 

The Pirates became one of only six teams in the 20th century to have won a World Series after trailing three games to one. Two of those teams were the Pirates, in 1925 and 1979. The others were the 1903 Boston Red Sox (in a best-of-nine series), 1958 New York Yankees, 1968 Detroit Tigers, and 1985 Kansas City Royals. Five Pirates had 10 or more hits in this series, a World Series record.

Chuck Tanner's mother died the morning of Game 5 (this was mentioned during the telecast by announcer Howard Cosell). 1960 World Series hero Bill Mazeroski threw out the first ball in Game 5.
The Pittsburgh Pirates were the last team in the 20th Century to win Game 7 of the World Series on the road. U.S. President Jimmy Carter made an appearance in Game 7, he threw out the first ball, and after the game made a visit to the victorious Pittsburgh locker room.

Willie Stargell at 39 was the oldest player to win MVP honors for both the National League and the World Series. In the World Series, he hit .400 with a record seven extra-base hits and matched Reggie Jackson's record of 25 total bases, set in 1977. Stargell, pitcher Bruce Kison, infielder Rennie Stennett, and catcher Manny Sanguillén were the only players left over from the 1971 World Series, when the Pirates faced the Orioles. Orioles' pitcher Jim Palmer, Mark Belanger, and manager Earl Weaver were the only ones who were still with the team that faced the Pirates in 1971.

As was the case when the same two teams played in the 1971 World Series, a game in Baltimore was rained out. Game 1 of this series was postponed, while Game 2 of the 1971 series had to be moved back a day. In this Series, it was the American League team's "turn" to play by National League rules, meaning that there was no designated hitter and the Orioles' pitchers would have to bat. While this resulted in pitcher Tim Stoddard getting his first major league hit and RBI in Game 4. Overall, it hurt the Orioles because Lee May, their designated hitter for much of the season and a key part of their offense, was only able to bat three times in the whole series.
The Pirates wore four different uniform combinations during the series: gold cap, black jersey and gold pants for Games 1 & 5, black cap, gold jersey and black pants for Games 2, 6 & 7, black cap and solid white pinstriped uniform for Game 3 and a black cap and solid gold uniform for Game 4.

Game 1 
October 10, 1979, at Memorial Stadium in Baltimore, Maryland. Attendance: 53,735

Game 2 
October 11, 1979, at Memorial Stadium in Baltimore, Maryland. Attendance: 53,739

Game 3 
October 12, 1979, at Three Rivers Stadium in Pittsburgh, Pennsylvania. Attendance: 50,848

Game 4 
October 13, 1979, at Three Rivers Stadium in Pittsburgh, Pennsylvania. Attendance: 50,883

Game 5 
October 14, 1979, at Three Rivers Stadium in Pittsburgh, Pennsylvania. Attendance: 50,920

Game 6 
October 16, 1979, at Memorial Stadium in Baltimore, Maryland. Attendance: 53,739

Game 7 
October 17, 1979, at Memorial Stadium in Baltimore, Maryland. Attendance: 53,733

Composite Box 
 1979 World Series (4-3): Pittsburgh Pirates (N.L.) over Baltimore Orioles (A.L.)

Awards and honors 
 Willie Stargell, Associated Press Athlete of the Year
 Willie Stargell, 1B, Babe Ruth Award
 Willie Stargell, 1B, National League Most Valuable Player Award
 Willie Stargell, 1B, National League Championship Series Most Valuable Player Award
 Willie Stargell, 1B, World Series Most Valuable Player Award

All-Stars 
1979 Major League Baseball All-Star Game
 Dave Parker, OF, starter, game MVP

League leaders 
 Omar Moreno, National League stolen base leader, 77
 Dave Parker, led NL in extra-base hits
 Dave Parker, led NL in sacrifice flies

Other team leaders 
 Runs scored – Omar Moreno (110)
 Stolen bases – Omar Moreno (77)
 Walks – Dave Parker (67)

Farm system

Notes

References 
 1979 Pittsburgh Pirates at Baseball Reference
 1979 Pittsburgh Pirates at Baseball Almanac
 

Pittsburgh Pirates seasons
Pittsburgh Pirates season
National League East champion seasons
National League champion seasons
World Series champion seasons
Pittsburg